Vietnam: 1965-1975 is a board wargame that simulates the Vietnam war. It is designed by Nick Karp and was published in 1984 by Victory Games a subsidiary of Avalon Hill.

Karp was a 21-year-old senior at Princeton University when he designed the game. He called it a "serious attempt" to simulate the conflict. Karp spent 18 months researching and designing the game. It combines military and political concerns. "The emphasis of the game is on politics," said Karp. "Every action in the game has a corresponding morale effect in the U.S. and in South Vietnam: bombing the North, sending new troops, high casualty levels. The U.S. has to balance military needs with the ability of the U.S. to cater to them." The game includes a 48-page manual on topics such as "Search and Destroy Operations," "Airmobility," "Pacification" and "Strategic Bombing." Smaller scenarios can be played in an evening, but to play the entire war (campaign) can take 100 to 400 hours.

The game was criticized for being made too soon after the war when American families still grieved from the losses, but has since found acceptance. It highly regarded among wargamers for capturing the feel of Vietnam. It has been called "brilliant", "seminal", and "ingenious". A new edition will be published by GMT Games with updated components and artwork.

Reception
Vietnam was awarded the Charles S. Roberts Award for "Best Graphic Presentation of 1984" and "Best 20th Century Boardgame of 1984".

Reviews
 Casus Belli #22 (Oct 1984)

See also
List of Vietnam War games#Board games

References

External links
"Vietnam 1965-1975: rediscovering a wargaming masterpiece", by Patrick Mullen in Quarter to Three, November 1, 2016

Board games introduced in 1984
Victory Games
Vietnam War board wargames